Labeobarbus werneri is a species of ray-finned fish in the genus Labeobarbus is found in Africa.

References 

werneri
Fish described in 1929